Aquarius is an EP by Boards of Canada, released on 5 January 1998. It is one of the shortest releases by Boards of Canada, barely breaking the 13-minute mark. The track "Chinook" is a longer version of one that appeared on Boc Maxima, a publicly unreleased predecessor to Music Has the Right to Children. "Aquarius" was the only single produced for the record.

Composition
The track contains a sample of "Aquarius" by Ren Woods as featured in the film version of Hair. The version of "Aquarius" on this EP is a different version than the one featured on Music Has the Right to Children.

In popular culture
"Aquarius" was later covered by La Musique Populaire on their album A Century of Song.

Track listing
 "Aquarius" – 5:59
 "Chinook" – 7:13

Boards of Canada albums
1998 EPs
Skam Records EPs